Martin Glynn (10 November 1729 – 20 July 1794) last Rector of the Irish College of Bordeaux.

Glynn was born in the Diocese of Tuam, his native place given as "Boffin" (probably Inishbofin, County Galway) and his parents as Denis Glynn and Honora Hosty. He was educated for the priesthood at the Irish seminary and Jesuit college of Bordeaux. In 1753 he received the degree of master of arts (from the University of Bordeaux) and was in 1775 appointed superior of the Irish college in the city. In 1780 Dr. Glynn traveled around Ireland and Britain fundraising for the College.

During the French Revolution, the college was seized by a Jacobin mob. The students were sent home but Glynn remained in the city and continued his priestly ministry without renouncing allegiance to the Pope, as demanded by the Civil Constitution of the Clergy. In July 1794 he was found celebrating Mass in a private house and given a perfunctory trial. The judgment was " as Glynn, the non-conforming priest, has tried to escape the law of deportation, and must be ranked as an aristocrat and enemy of the Revolution, it is ordered that the death sentence be carried out in his case."

He was guillotined in Bordeaux on 20 July 1794.

See also
 Glynn (disambiguation)

References

 Biographical Dictionary of Irishmen in France, Richard Hayes, Dublin, 1949

18th-century Irish Roman Catholic priests
18th-century Roman Catholic martyrs
People from County Galway
Irish people executed abroad
People executed by guillotine during the French Revolution
University of Bordeaux alumni
Executed Roman Catholic priests
Year of birth unknown
1729 births
1794 deaths